Access to History is a British book series designed for pre-university study. The series was conceived by and developed by Keith Randell (1943-2002) who wanted to produce books for students "as they are, not as we might wish them to be". The series is published by Hodder Education, and features titles relevant for all of the major awarding bodies, including AQA, Pearson Edexcel, OCR and WJEC.

Incomplete list of titles
The Later Stuarts and the Glorious Revolution 1660-1702, Oliver Bullock.
The Early Stuarts and the English Revolution 1603-1660, Katherine Brice and Michael Lynch.
Crisis in the Middle East: Israel and the Arab States 1945-2007, Michael Scott-Baumann.
From Second Reich to Third Reich Germany 1918-45 for Edexcel, Geoff Layton.
Germany Divided and Reunited 1945-91, Angela Leonard & Nigel Bushnell.
Italy: The Rise of Fascism 1896-1946, Mark Robson.
Prosperity, Depression and the New Deal: The USA 1890-1954, Peter Clements.
Sweden and the Baltic, 1523-1721, Andrina Stiles.
The Unification of Germany 1815-1919, Alan Farmer.
Reaction and Revolution: Russia 1894-1924, Michael Lynch.
The Unification of Italy, 1815-70, Andrina Stiles & Robert Pearce.
The USA and the Cold War, 1945-63, Oliver Edwards.
Napoleon, France and Europe, Andrina Stiles and Dylan Rees.
France in Revolution 1774-1815, Sixth Edition, Dylan Rees.
France 1814-70, Monarchy Republic and Empire, Keith Randell.
France: The Third Republic, 1870-1914, Keith Randell.

See also
Seminar Studies in History

References

Series of history books
Hodder & Stoughton books